Verticordia mitodes is a flowering plant in the myrtle family, Myrtaceae and is endemic to the south-west of Western Australia. It is a shrub with a single, highly-branched main stem, small leaves and small spikes of magenta-coloured flowers in late spring.

Description

Flowering time is from late October to December.

Taxonomy and naming
Verticordia mitodes was first formally described by Alex George in 1991 and the description was published in Nuytsia. The specific epithet (mitodes) is an Ancient Greek word meaning "thread-like" referring to the fringe on the petals.

George placed this species in subgenus Eperephes, section Verticordella along with V. pennigera, V. halophila, V. bifimbriata, V. lindleyi, V. blepharophylla, V. drummondii, V. wonganensis,V. paludosa, V. luteola, V. attenuata, V. tumida, V. carinata, V. centipeda, V. auriculata, V. pholidophylla, V. spicata and V. hughanii.

Distribution and habitat
This verticordia grows in sandy soil, sometimes with gravel and loam, in heath and shrubland, often with other species of verticordia. It occurs between Mukinbudin, Bungalbin, Narembeen and Marvel Loch, Western Australia in the Avon Wheatbelt and Coolgardie biogeographic regions.

Conservation
Verticordia mitodes is classified as "Priority Three" by the Western Australian Government Department of Parks and Wildlife, meaning that it is poorly known and known from only a few locations but is not under imminent threat.

Use in horticulture
In cultivation, V. mitodes is slow growing, producing a small bushy plant which flowers from November to March. Propagation from seed has proven easier than from cuttings and established plants are frost and drought tolerant.

References

mitodes
Rosids of Western Australia
Eudicots of Western Australia
Plants described in 1991